The Sound of a Flower is 2015 South Korean period drama film based on the life of Jin Chae-seon, who became Joseon's first female pansori singer in 1867. Jin risks her life by cross-dressing as a man, at a time when women were forbidden to sing in public or perform on stage. The film focuses on the relationship between Jin and her pansori teacher, Shin Jae-hyo. The Korean title, Dorihwaga, is a song written by Shin about his protégée after she became a court singer.

The film was directed by Lee Jong-pil, who also co-wrote the screenplay with Kim Ah-young. Bae Suzy, who plays Jin Chae-seon, studied pansori for a year to prepare for the role. Ryu Seung-ryong plays her teacher, Shin Jae-hyo. Kim Nam-gil is the king's father and regent (the Heungseon Daewongun) and Song Sae-byeok is Kim Se-jong, a famous pansori singer. Lee Dong-hwi and Ahn Jae-hong play Shin's disciples.

Plot
Jin Chae-seon is an orphan raised by a gisaeng during the Joseon era in 1867. She enjoys pansori performances and eavesdrops on lessons at the pansori school. She secretly practices singing when she is alone, and asks pansori teacher Shin Jae-hyo to teach her. She is immediately rejected because females are not allowed to learn pansori and perform in public. She then disguises herself by cross-dressing as a man, but got rejected again. When Shin hears the news that the king's father and ruler of Joseon, Heungseon Daewongun, is going to hold a national pansori contest, he changes his mind and decides to train Jin for the competition. However, no one must discover that Jin is a woman, or they both will face death.

After a period of training, Jin performs the Chunhyangga at the palace. Heungseon Daewongun is enchanted by her performance and decides to keep her at court. Shin Jae-hyo then realizes how much he loves her and composes "Dorihwaga" to express his longing for his pupil.

Cast
Ryu Seung-ryong as Shin Jae-hyo
Bae Suzy as Jin Chae-seon
Song Sae-byeok as Kim Se-jong
Kim Nam-gil as Heungseon Daewongun
Lee Dong-hwi as Chil-sung
Ahn Jae-hong as Yong-bok
Kim Tae-hoon as Low level official
Shin Cheol-jin as Government Official	
Kim So-jin as Chae-seon's mother
Ham Sung-min as Dongrijeong Temple disciple

Release and reception
The film was released in South Korea on November 25, 2015. It was widely anticipated due to the high-profile cast, and had the most ticket reservations. However, it ranked a disappointing fourth place in the box office, drawing only 245,000 viewers during its opening weekend. Industry watchers attributed this to the film's "boring plotline" and Suzy's "unpolished" vocal performance. Lee Mi-ji of StarN News blamed the film's loss of focus and "stagnation" in its second half; it focused on the romance between Jin Chae-seon and Shin Jae-hyo, rather than Jin's life story. The film ranked thirteenth place in its second weekend, and had sold a total of 300,729 tickets at that time, earning ₩2.1 billion (US$1.8 million).

The film received mostly negative reviews from critics, who criticized the editing and screenplay, as well as Suzy's performance. Jin Eun-soo of Korea JoongAng Daily gave the film a mixed review. She praised Suzy's performance, but criticized some aspects of the screenplay, complaining that "somewhere along the way the film became an ode to Suzy, not Jin Chae-seon".

Awards and nominations

References

External links

2015 films
South Korean biographical drama films
Films set in the Joseon dynasty
Pansori
2015 biographical drama films
CJ Entertainment films
Films set in 1867
Biographical films about singers
South Korean historical drama films
Cultural depictions of South Korean women
Cultural depictions of folk musicians
2010s historical drama films
2015 drama films
2010s South Korean films